Martin Borulya is a 1953 Soviet comedy drama film directed by Aleksei Shvachko and Gnat Yura and starring Yura, Varvara Chayka and Olga Kusenko. It was made in Ukrainian at the Dovzhenko Film Studios in Kyiv.

Cast
 Gnat Yura as Martyn Borulya  
 Varvara Chayka as Palazhka 
 Olga Kusenko as Marysya  
 Sergey Olekseyenko as Stepan  
 Maryan Krushelnitsky as Omelko  
 Grigoriy Teslya as Gervasiy Gulyanitskiy  
 Vasiliy Dashenko as Mikola  
 Dmitri Milyutenko as Protasiy Penenozhka  
 Nikolay Yakovchenko as Trandalyov  
 Nikolay Svitenko as Dulskiy 
 Semyon Likhogodenko as Trokhim 
 Grigori Semyonovich Aleksandrov

References

Bibliography 
 Vi͡a͡cheslav Oleksandrovych Kudin. Soviet Ukrainian screen art. Mistetstvo Publishers, 1979.

External links 
 

1953 films
1953 comedy-drama films
Soviet comedy-drama films
Ukrainian-language films
Films directed by Aleksei Shvachko
Soviet black-and-white films
Soviet-era Ukrainian films